Duurstede may refer to:
 Dorestad, the major early medieval trading centre 

 Duurstede Castle, the late medieval castle there
 Wijk bij Duurstede, the modern-day town, named after the former
 Fort Duurstede, a 17th-century Dutch fortress in Indonesia
 Duurstede (restaurant), a now defunct restaurant